Sternaspis is a genus of annelids belonging to the family Sternaspidae.

The genus has cosmopolitan distribution.

Species:

Sternaspis affinis 
Sternaspis africana 
Sternaspis andamanensis 
Sternaspis annenkovae 
Sternaspis britayevi 
Sternaspis buzhinskajae 
Sternaspis chilensis 
Sternaspis chinensis 
Sternaspis costata 
Sternaspis fossor 
Sternaspis islandica 
Sternaspis lindae 
Sternaspis liui 
Sternaspis londognoi 
Sternaspis maior 
Sternaspis maureri 
Sternaspis nana 
Sternaspis papillosa 
Sternaspis piotrowskiae 
Sternaspis princeps 
Sternaspis radiata 
Sternaspis rietschi 
Sternaspis scutata 
Sternaspis sendalli 
Sternaspis shelockae 
Sternaspis sherlockae 
Sternaspis spinosa 
Sternaspis sunae 
Sternaspis thalassemoides 
Sternaspis thorsoni 
Sternaspis uschakovi 
Sternaspis williamsae

References

Terebellida
Polychaete genera